The United Utah Party (UUP) is a centrist political party in the United States. It was founded in 2017 and is active only in the state of Utah. The party identifies itself as politically moderate, and was created out of frustration with the Republican and Democratic parties.

History

Background and formation
Prior to the formation of the United Utah Party, Brigham Young University (BYU) political science professor Richard Davis had considered forming a political party for years. According to Davis, he found people were open to an alternative political party during the 2016 U.S. presidential election. He announced the formation of the party on May 22, 2017. Davis became a chairperson for the party. Jim Bennett, the son of former U.S. Senator Bob Bennett, was the party's executive director until he stepped down to run as the UUP's candidate in a special congressional election to replace Jason Chaffetz.
Nils Bergeson, a former U.S. foreign service officer, became the party's second executive director in 2018.

2017 Utah congressional election

On May 26, 2017, Jim Bennett attempted to apply as an affiliated candidate in Utah's 3rd congressional district special election, 2017, but the lieutenant governor's office rejected the application because the elections office had not had 30 days to finish certifying the new party. Bennett refused to register as an unaffiliated candidate. Utah's elections office certified the party on June 27, 2017.

On June 21, 2017, the UUP filed a lawsuit against Utah state officials to get Bennett's name on the ballot. In court, a Utah state attorney argued that the UUP could have formed earlier to meet the application deadline. A party lawyer argued that only a "soothsayer" could have predicted that Jason Chaffetz would resign from the U.S. House of Representatives. On August 2, 2017, a federal judge in charge of the case ordered Utah election officials to allow Bennett on the ballot under the United Utah Party.

In late September 2017, Bennett narrowly qualified to participate in the Utah Debate Commission's selective debate, along with the election's Republican and Democratic candidates, John Curtis and Kathie Allen. The special election was held on November 7, 2017, and Bennett conceded the race hours after the polls closed and initial results showed Curtis winning and Allen getting second place. Bennett got third place with 9.3% of the popular vote.

2018 House of Representatives elections

In February 2018, two UUP candidates announced they would run for the United States House of Representatives: Jan Garbett and Logan, Utah native Eric Eliason, who challenged Republicans Chris Stewart and Rob Bishop respectively. On March 20, 2018, the United Utah Party held caucuses at 19 locations with attendance of just over 900 people, when the party had just over 400 registered members. Garbett later withdrew from the race. Eliason was defeated, receiving 11.6% of the vote as Rob Bishop was reelected to what would become his final term.

2020 elections

Candidates

2022 elections

Candidates

Political positions
According to former UUP chairman Richard Davis, the party's platform is mostly based on laws and principles, rather than specific social positions. He told The Salt Lake Tribune that the party supports term limits, stricter campaign-finance laws, efforts to stop gerrymandering, and increased school funding. The party's platform also includes enforcing immigration laws "with compassion," and generally opposes abortion with specific exceptions. The party believes that public lands can be preserved while still allowing economic development. The UUP supports the right of responsible gun owners to possess firearms.

The UUP supports efforts to stop using taxpayer money in the Utah Republican Party's closed primary elections. On December 1, 2017, the party called for greater transparency regarding sexual harassment allegations on Capitol Hill. In January 2018, the UUP announced support for the "Our Schools Now" initiative, a proposed progressive tax meant to increase funding for education.

References

External links

2017 establishments in Utah
Centrist political parties in the United States
Political parties established in 2017
Regional and state political parties in Utah
Political parties in the United States